Franka Dietzsch (born 22 January 1968) is a German former discus thrower best known for winning gold medals at three World Championships in Athletics. She won the 1998 European Championships and 1999 World Championships, but did not return to the international podium until her win at the 2005 World Championships.

At the age of 39 she won her third world championship title in 2007 in Osaka. After spending a year away from the field due to health problems, she returned to competition at the Wiesbaden meet. She finished in second place with 61.49 metres, remaining focused on defending her discus World Champion at the 2009 World Championships, at which she finished 23rd at 58.44 metres, failing to qualify for the final. She retired the same year as one of the few remaining athletes to have represented East Germany internationally.

Her personal best throw is 69.51 metres, achieved in May 1999 in Wiesbaden. This result ranks her ninth among German discus throwers, behind Gabriele Reinsch, Ilke Wyludda, Diana Gansky-Sachse, Irina Meszynski, Gisela Beyer, Martina Hellmann-Opitz, Evelin Jahl and Silvia Madetzky.

Achievements

References

External links

 
 
 
 Official website

1968 births
Living people
People from Wolgast
German female discus throwers
German national athletics champions
East German female discus throwers
Athletes (track and field) at the 1992 Summer Olympics
Athletes (track and field) at the 2000 Summer Olympics
Athletes (track and field) at the 2004 Summer Olympics
Olympic athletes of Germany
World Athletics Championships medalists
European Athletics Championships medalists
Goodwill Games medalists in athletics
World Athletics Championships winners
Competitors at the 2001 Goodwill Games
Sportspeople from Mecklenburg-Western Pomerania
People from Bezirk Rostock